The following is a list of goalscorers in the FIFA Women's World Cup finals. Only goals scored during regulation or extra time are included. Any goals scored during the penalty shoot-out are excluded. As of the 2019 final, twenty individuals have scored a total of twenty-three goals in all of finals history. Two players have scored multiple goals in the finals, while Carli Lloyd is the only women's player to score a hat trick in a final. One player has done so via a penalty kick (Megan Rapinoe). Julie Johnston was the first player to score an own goal in a final.

Finals goalscorers

Players with most goals in the Finals

References

Lists of FIFA Women's World Cup players
FIFA Women's World Cup-related lists
FIFA Women's World Cup records and statistics